Pauline Kahurangi Yearbury (31 December 1926 – 27 May 1977) was a New Zealand artist. She is considered a leading practitioner in Māori modernist art, and her work is held by the Whangarei Museum, Auckland Art Gallery Toi o Tāmaki and Russell Museum.

Biography 
Yearbury was born in 1926 in Matauri Bay, Northland, New Zealand to Valentine Blomfield and Waiatua Hikuwai Ihaia. She went to school in Russell and in 1943 moved to Auckland to attend Elam School of Fine Arts. She was one of the first two Māori women who studied at the school. Among other subjects, she learnt painting with John Weeks and mural design with Archie Fisher, the head of the school. After graduating, she taught at the school.

In 1951 Yearbury moved back to Russell and worked creating murals and signs and tutoring in art. One of her largest murals was created in collaboration with her husband Jim - a nine-metre-long depiction of the signing of the Treaty of Waitangi for Waitangi Hotel in 1964. From 1966 to 1977 the couple also ran an art studio in the town, which displayed and sold the couple's wood panels of legendary Māori figures – these were designed by Yearbury and incised and coloured by her husband.

In 1976 Yearbury published The Children of Rangi and Papa, an illustrated book telling the Māori story of creation. The publication was made possible by a grant from the Māori Purposes Fund Board. The text was based on George Grey's book Polynesian Mythology, and the foreword was written by Member of Parliament Whetu Tirikatene-Sullivan. Yearbury's illustrations intended to "create a bridge between the European style of realism and the traditional Māori carving".

Yearbury's work was part of the First Māori Festival of the Arts held in 1963 at Ngāruawāhia, and was also part of the exhibition New Zealand Māori Culture and the Contemporary Scene held at Canterbury Museum in 1966 curated by Buck Nin; this exhibition was the first major exhibition of Māori art in a significant museum in New Zealand. The Department of External Affairs later funded the exhibition to tour to Sydney, Apia, Singapore, Kuala Lumpur, Hong Kong and Tokyo.

Legacy 
In 2014, her painting Papatuanuku and Ranginui was featured on a New Zealand Post postage stamp.

Personal life 
Yearbury married Jim Yearbury, a fellow student at Elam School of Fine Arts. She was of the Ngāpuhi iwi.

References

1926 births
1977 deaths
People from Russell, New Zealand
20th-century New Zealand artists
Ngāpuhi people
Elam Art School alumni
New Zealand Māori artists
20th-century New Zealand women artists
New Zealand women painters
Muralists
Women muralists